Beyond Oasis, is a 1994 action-adventure game developed by Ancient and published by Sega for the Sega Genesis. The game has also been re-released in various emulated collections. A prequel to the game, The Legend of Oasis, was released for the Sega Saturn in 1996.

Plot
The player takes the role of Prince Ali, who has discovered a buried gold "armlet" which once belonged to a wizard who waged a long war against the evil wielder of a silver armlet. The silver armlet was used to create chaos and destruction, while the gold armlet had the power to summon four spirits: the water spirit, "Dytto"; the fire spirit, "Efreet"; the shadow spirit, "Shade"; and the plant spirit, "Bow". Ali travels the land of Oasis, gradually acquiring the ability to summon all these spirits, in an attempt to stop the person who has discovered the ancient silver armlet and is once again using it for evil.

Gameplay

The game has action adventure elements similar to The Legend of Zelda series. The player controls Prince Ali and control him across the map to fulfill his quest. Along the way the player picks up special items to restore health and mana, special weapons to help defeat enemies, and four magic spirits found in shrines to aid Prince Ali in his mission.

Prince Ali's default weapon is his knife, which can perform special attacks and has unlimited usage, but during the course of the game the player can equip Prince Ali with special weapons such as swords, crossbows, and bombs. Some crossbows (and a sword) can ignite their targets on fire. However, unlike the knife, these weapons do not have unlimited usage and will break after a set number of uses.

Reception

Game Informer gave the game a "very good" score of 8.75/10. Electronic Gaming Monthly gave it a 38/50 (7.6/10 average), praising the vast game world and strong plot twists. A reviewer for Next Generation contended that the combination of RPG and action elements results in a game which is average on both fronts. He added that, "The use of magic, whether it be the fireball or meteor storm; a user-friendly interface; and an ever-ready map put Beyond Oasis beyond others of its type. But ultimately, poor fighting and an uninspired storyline leave this title looking more like a mirage." GamePro commented that the game "is definitely not for hardcore RPGers" due to its small game world, limited challenge, and greater emphasis on hack-n-slash combat and puzzle solving than on RPG elements, but would be a good game for players new to the RPG genre. They praised the "intriguing" gameplay and the 3D feel of the graphics.

IGN gave the Virtual Console re-release an 8/10, calling it "very stylish," and expressing "surprise" that despite a lack of polish in certain areas, its "unique" mechanics "deserve to be mentioned alongside such classics as Secret of Mana." In 2017, Gamesradar rated Beyond Oasis 38th on their Best Sega Genesis/Mega Drive games of all time and giving praise to the games graphics and sound.

References

External links
RPGClassics' The Story of Thor Shrine
Hardcore Gaming 101's series overview

1994 video games
Action-adventure games
Ancient (company) games
Fantasy video games
Nintendo Switch Online games
Sega Genesis games
Sega video games
Single-player video games
Video games based on Arabian mythology
Video games developed in Japan
Video games scored by Yuzo Koshiro
Virtual Console games